The Wolf Branch School District 113 in Swansea, Illinois consists of one middle and one elementary school. The elementary school is for grades pre-school to grade four. The middle school is for grades five through eight. The principals for the elementary and middle schools are Ms. Madonna Harris and Mr. Jeff Burkett, respectively.

References

External links
 

Education in St. Clair County, Illinois
School districts in Illinois